is a Japanese bobsledder. He competed in the four man event at the 1998 Winter Olympics.

References

1970 births
Living people
Japanese male bobsledders
Olympic bobsledders of Japan
Bobsledders at the 1998 Winter Olympics
Sportspeople from Wakayama Prefecture